Geen is a surname. Notable people with the surname include:

Benjamin Geen (born 1980), English nurse
Billy Geen (1891–1915), Welsh rugby union player

See also
 Van Geen
 Green (surname)
 Jean (surname)